Tarand-e Bala (also Romanized as Ţārand-e Bālā; also known as Ţārand-e ‘Olyā) is a village in Tarand-e Bala Rural District of Jalilabad District of Pishva County, Tehran province, Iran. At the 2006 National Census, its population was 1,173 in 262 households, when it was in the former Pishva District of Varamin County. The following census in 2011 counted 1,375 people in 348 households, by which time the district had been separated from the county and Pishva County established. The latest census in 2016 showed a population of 1,283 people in 327 households; it was the largest village in its rural district.

References 

Pishva County

Populated places in Tehran Province

Populated places in Pishva County